The Neftchi Baku 2010–11 season is Neftchi Baku's nineteenth Azerbaijan Premier League season, and their only season under manager Arif Asadov.

Squad

 (captain)

On loan

Transfers

Summer

In:

 

Out:

Winter

In:

 

Out:

Competitions

Azerbaijan Premier League

First round

Results

Table

Championship group

Results

Table

Azerbaijan Cup

Squad statistics

Appearances and goals

|-
|colspan="14"|Players who appeared for Neftchi who left on loan during the season:

|-
|colspan="14"|Players who appeared for Neftchi who left during the season:

|}

Goal scorers

Disciplinary record

Player of the Month

References

External links 
 Neftchi Baku at Soccerway.com

Neftçi PFK seasons
Neftchi Baku